Alfred Reul (1 August 1909 – 16 March 1980) was a Polish cyclist. He competed in the team pursuit event at the 1928 Summer Olympics.

References

External links
 

1909 births
1980 deaths
Polish male cyclists
Olympic cyclists of Poland
Cyclists at the 1928 Summer Olympics
Sportspeople from Łódź
People from Piotrków Governorate